A beauty store, beauty supply store or cosmetics store is a specialty retailer that sells cosmetics, hair-care products and/or beauty tools. The term "beauty store" (without "supply") is often associated with large chains that provide a large-format, glamorous shopping experience whereas "beauty supply store" (including "supply") is associated with smaller, independent retailers.

The industry collectively is referred to by various terms such as under the NAICS classification system, Cosmetics, Beauty Supplies & Perfume Stores (NAICS 446120), comprising establishments known as cosmetic or perfume stores or beauty supply shops primarily engaged in retailing cosmetics, perfumes, toiletries, and personal grooming products.

Chains
Chains of beauty stores include:
Bath & Body Works
bluemercury
Douglas
ICI Paris XL
Lush
M·A·C
Merle Norman
Müller
Sally Beauty
Sephora
Ulta Beauty

References